Salpiglossis sinuata, the painted tongue, scalloped tube tongue, velvet trumpet flower,  palito amargo ( Spanish : bitter little stick - from the extreme bitterness of its leaves) or panza de burro
( Spanish : donkey's paunch ), is a flowering plant belonging to the subfamily Cestroideae of the nightshade family Solanaceae, native to southern Chile.

Description

Cultivation and uses
Of the two species in its genus, Salpiglossis sinuata is the more commonly grown as an ornamental plant for gardens. It was introduced to the northern hemisphere in the 1820s.

A number of cultivars have been selected for different flower colours. It is grown in full sunlight.

Gallery

References

Cestroideae
Flora of Chile
Garden plants of South America
Plants described in 1798